Danko/Fjeld/Andersen was the first of two albums featuring the multi-national folk trio of Rick Danko (Canada), Jonas Fjeld (Norway) and Eric Andersen (United States). The album melds elements of folk, rock, country and blues.

First released on Stageway Records in Norway on 3 June 1991, it was released in the United States on Rykodisc on 28 September 1993.

It was reissued as One More Shot in 2002 with a second disc containing a live concert by the trio recorded at Moldejazz in Norway in 1991. Danko died in 1999.

Reception
The album received perfect reviews from Fredrik Wandrup in Dagbladet, issuing 6 out of 6 stars, as well as in Glåmdalen who already called it as "album of the year". Furthermore, the album received favourable reviews in the Norwegian newspapers VG ("die throw" 5), Bergens Arbeiderblad (album of the week), Nordlandsposten (album of the week), Fædrelandsvennen and Harstad Tidende. Mediocre to above-average reviews were printed by Bergens Tidende and Drammens Tidende ("die throw" 4).

Track listing
 "Driftin' Away" (Eric Andersen, Rick Danko, Elizabeth Danko) – 5:13
 "Blue Hotel" (Jonas Fjeld, Jim Sherraden) – 4:02
 "One More Shot" (Paul Kennerley) – 3:13
 "Mary I'm Comin' Back Home" (Eric Andersen) – 3:42
 "Blue River" (Eric Andersen) – 4:49
 "Judgement Day" (Traditional) – 2:08
 "When Morning Comes to America" (Jonas Fjeld, Jim Sherraden) – 4:02
 "Wrong Side of Town" (Eric Andersen, Jonas Fjeld, Rick Danko) – 4:53
 "Sick and Tired" (Eric Andersen, Rick Danko, Chris Kenner) – 3:48
 "Angels in the Snow" (Eric Andersen, Jonas Fjeld, Ole Paus) – 4:31
 "Blaze of Glory" (Larry Keith, Danny Morrison, Johnny Slate) – 3:21
 "Last Thing On My Mind" (Tom Paxton) – 3:46

Personnel
Rick Danko – acoustic guitar, bass guitar, double bass, vocals
Jonas Fjeld – acoustic guitar, pedal steel, percussion, vocals
Eric Andersen – acoustic guitar, piano, harmonica, vocals
Rune Arnesen – drums, percussion
Hallvard T. Bjørgum – Hardanger fiddle
Audun Erlien – bass guitar
Laase Hafreager – Hammond organ
Garth Hudson – accordion
Knut Reiersrud – guitars, piano, mandolin, harmonica
Kristin Skaare – accordion, piano, keyboards
Martin Lisland – backing vocals
Solfrid Stene – backing vocals
Hilde Kjeldsen – backing vocals
Kristine Pettersen: backing vocals

References

1991 albums
Rick Danko albums
Eric Andersen albums
Rykodisc albums
Jonas Fjeld albums